Ronald Mann (born June 13, 1958), credited professionally as Ron Mann, is a Canadian documentary film director. 

His work includes the films Imagine the Sound (1981); Comic Book Confidential (1988); Grass (1999) and Go Further (2003), both of which feature Woody Harrelson; In the Wake of the Flood (2010), which features author Margaret Atwood; and Altman (2014), about the life and career of film director Robert Altman. 

Mann has served as mentor to and worked with many filmmakers from the Toronto New Wave of the 1980s, including Atom Egoyan, Bruce McDonald, Jeremy Podeswa, and Peter Mettler.

Career

1970s–1980s 
A graduate of the University of Toronto, Mann began making films at a young age, creating Super 8mm films in the 1970s. 

Mann began making short films while in high school and studied briefly at Vermont's Bennington College before receiving a B.A. in film from the University of Toronto. His 1973 student film, The Strip, documented the historic Yonge Street strip.

Mann did not attend film school; instead, he learned filmmaking first-hand and using his own funds. In an interview with Now, he described this process: Every film was my last movie, I would go into debt, make another film to get myself out of debt. That's how I actually needed to keep going.Mann made his first feature, Imagine the Sound, in his early twenties. The film, released in 1981, deals with the once-controversial genre of free jazz. Critic and film historian Jonathan Rosenbaum has said that Imagine the Sound "may be the best documentary on free jazz that we have." 

In 1984, he made his only fiction film, Listen to the City. Mann has also made numerous short films, including Echoes Without Saying (1983), about the publishing and printing company Coach House Press and its founder Stan Bevington, and Marcia Resnick's Bad Boys (1985), about the New York based photographer.

Mann found success with his 1988 documentary Comic Book Confidential. The film is a survey of the history of the comic book medium in the United States from the 1930s to the 1980s, as an art form and in social context. Confidential was first released theatrically in Canada in 1988, and in the United States on April 27, 1989. The film received the 1989 Genie Award for Best Feature Length Documentary from the Academy of Canadian Cinema and Television. Caryn James of The New York Times found the film deft and intelligent—it "takes off when it abandons the archives and focuses on the creators," but "it plays to the converted," and its attempt to relate comics to social context is "fleeting."

1990s–2000s 
Mann continued to make documentaries throughout the 1990s and 2000s. His 1999 film was Grass, a documentary about the history of the United States government's war on marijuana in the 20th century. Narrated by actor Woody Harrelson, it premiered at the 1999 Toronto International Film Festival and won the Genie Award for Best Feature Length Documentary. His 2003 film, Go Further, saw him re-team with Harrelson on a film that followed a group of environmental activists riding around in a large, bio-fueled bus. The film debuted at the South by Southwest Film Festival in March 2003, and at the Toronto International Film Festival in September 2003, where it was first runner-up for the People's Choice Award. It was also nominated for a Genie Award for Best Documentary.

In 2003, Mann co-founded a film distribution company called FilmsWeLike with Gary Topp. FilmWeLike's curation has been described by Vice as a "veritable auteur smorgasbord."

In 2009, he released a documentary on mushrooms and mushroom hunting called Know Your Mushrooms.

2010s–present 
In 2014, Mann directed the Robert Altman-based documentary Altman. Peter Bradshaw of The Guardian praised the film.

His latest film is Carmine Street Guitars (2018). The film depicts Carmine Street Guitars, a long-running guitar store in New York City. It premiered at the 75th Venice International Film Festival, and had its Canadian premiere at the 2018 Toronto International Film Festival. It went into general theatrical release in April 2019.

Impact 
Mann has served as mentor to and worked with many filmmakers from the Toronto New Wave of the 1980s, including Atom Egoyan, Bruce McDonald, Jeremy Podeswa, and Peter Mettler.

Filmography
Imagine the Sound (1981)
Poetry in Motion (1982)
Comic Book Confidential (1988)
The Twist (1992)
Dream Tower (1994)
Grass (1999)
Go Further (2003)
Tales of the Rat Fink (2006)
Know Your Mushrooms (2008)
In the Wake of the Flood (2010) featuring author Margaret Atwood
Altman (2014)
Carmine Street Guitars (2018)

References

External links 

Ron Mann's website
Ron Mann archives at the University of Toronto Media Commons

1959 births
Living people
Canadian documentary film directors
University of Toronto alumni
Film directors from Toronto
Directors of Genie and Canadian Screen Award winners for Best Documentary Film